
Gmina Bolków is an urban-rural gmina (administrative district) in Jawor County, Lower Silesian Voivodeship, in south-western Poland.

Neighbouring gminas
Gmina Bolków is bordered by the town of Wojcieszów and the gminas of Dobromierz, Janowice Wielkie, Marciszów, Męcinka, Paszowice, Stare Bogaczowice and Świerzawa.

Villages
Apart from the town of Bolków, the gmina contains the villages of Figlów, Gorzanowice, Grudno, Jastrowiec, Jeżów, Kaczorów, Lipa, Muchówek,  Mysłów, Nowe Rochowice, Okrajnik, Płonina, Półwsie, Radzimowice, Sady Dolne, Sady Górne, Stare Rochowice, Świny, Wierzchosławice, Wierzchosławiczki and Wolbromek.

Twin towns – sister cities

Gmina Bolków is twinned with:
 Bad Muskau, Germany (2006)
 Borken, Germany (1997)
 Doksy, Czech Republic (2006)

References

Bolkow
Jawor County